William Blackburn (1750–1790) was an English architect.

William Blackburn may also refer to:

W. Jasper Blackburn (1820–1899), American politician
William M. Blackburn (1828–1898), American university president
William Blackburn (cricketer) (1888–1941), English cricketer
William Blackburn (footballer), Born in Bury, (D.O.B. unknown), played for Rochdale in 1930.